Free at Last is the second studio album by rapper Freeway. It was released on November 20, 2007, in the United States by Roc-A-Fella Records.

Background
In a recent interview, Freeway stated why he took such a lengthy hiatus. He had this to say:

Production
Free at Last features production from Bink!, J. R. Rotem, Needlz, and Cool & Dre, amongst others. Guest appearances include Marsha Ambrosius, Jay-Z, 50 Cent, Scarface, Busta Rhymes, Jadakiss, and Rick Ross.

Commercial performance
Free at Last debuted at number 42 on the U.S. Billboard 200 chart, selling about 36,000 units during its first week. As of April 2, 2008, the album has sold 100,206 copies in the United States.

Critical reception

Free at Last was called "The Album of the Month" by the German hip hop magazine Juice, aiming 5 of 6 "Crowns".
In the 01-02 / 2008 Issue (# 104).

Track listing

Singles 
"Roc-A-Fella Billionaires" is the lead single. The song, produced by Dame Grease, features a guest appearance from Roc-A-Fella label-boss and fellow American rapper Jay-Z. Grease's production contains a sample of a version of "Big Spender", originally written for the 1966 musical Sweet Charity, by Cy Coleman and Dorothy Fields, as performed by Chita Rivera and Paula Kelly.

Sample credits
This Can't Be Real
"Did You Hear What They Said?" by Gil Scott-Heron
It's Over
"The Masquerade Is Over" by David Porter
vocals by Sean Michael from "Encore"
Still Got Love
"Keep On Keeping On" by Curtis Mayfield
Roc-A-Fella Billionaires
"Hey Big Spender" by Shirley Bassey
When They Remember
"The Way We Were" by Gladys Knight and The Pips
Reppin' The Streets
"Ill Be the Other Woman" by Soul Children
Free At Last
"I Want To Write You a Love Song" by David Oliver
Baby Don't Do It
"Overture of Foxy Brown" by Willie Hutch
I Cry
"I Cry" by Millie Jackson

Charts

Weekly charts

Year-end charts

References

2007 albums
Def Jam Recordings albums
Freeway (rapper) albums
Roc-A-Fella Records albums
Albums produced by Cool & Dre
Albums produced by Dame Grease
Albums produced by J. R. Rotem
Albums produced by Needlz
Albums produced by Don Cannon
Albums produced by Bink (record producer)
Albums produced by Jake One
Albums produced by Double-O